Profile or profiles may refer to:

Art, entertainment and media

Music
 Profile (Jan Akkerman album), 1973
 Profile (Githead album), 2005
 Profile (Pat Donohue album), 2005
 Profile (Duke Pearson album), 1959
 Profiles (Nick Mason and Rick Fenn album), a 1985 album by Nick Mason and Rick Fenn
 Profiles (Gary McFarland album), a 1966 live album by Gary McFarland
 Profile (Misako Odani album), 1997
 Profile (Wolfe Tones album)

Film and television
 Profile (2018 film), a film directed by Timur Bekmambetov
 Profile (1954 film), British thriller film
 Profile (1955 TV series) (1955–1957), a Canadian biographical television series
 Profiles (TV series) (1979–1980), a Canadian biographical television series
 Profile (2018 TV series), an American streaming television talk show

Other art, entertainment and media
 Profile (Marvel Comics), a Marvel Comics character
 Profile (novel), a 2009 novel by Chris Westwood
 "The Profile" (short story), a 1907 short story by Willa Cather

Classification of individuals and groups of people
 Demographic profile, information about a person or market segment, commonly used in marketing. May also include photographic information (e.g., "profile picture")
 Investor profile, a classification of investor behavior
 Profile, a dossier of offender profiling data

Computing and technology 
 Profile (engineering), with several meanings in the context of engineering
 Profile (UML), a concept in Unified Modeling Language
 Apple ProFile, a hard drive
 FIS Profile, a banking transaction processing database engine
 ICC profile, used for colour management of computer displays and digital images
 User profile, refers to the computer representation of user information
 Profiling (computer programming), a form of performance analysis to investigate the behavior of a software program

Other meanings
 Profile Books, a British independent publisher
 Profile portrait
 Profile Spotlight, a stage lighting fixture
 Strategy profile, a concept in game theory
 Old Man of the Mountain, a former rock formation in New Hampshire also known as the Profile
 a curved (molding) or plain fascia connecting surfaces, mostly decoratively, in architecture
 a genre of portrait art depicted from the perspective of the side

See also
 Profiling (disambiguation)
 Low profile (disambiguation)